"Talking Like I'm Falling Down Stairs" is the first single taken from Sparkadia's second studio album The Great Impression, released in Australia on September 1, 2010. The single received high rotation on Australian radio network Triple J and placed at #24 in their Hottest 100 of 2010.

Chart positions
Australia - #59

Music video
The official music video was filmed on location in an 1930s mental asylum in Auckland, New Zealand in September 2010. The video was directed by New Zealand video agency Blur And Sharpen. The building was converted into an art school in the 1990s and was subsequently purchased by the Church of Scientology.

 Alexander Burnett described the grandiose and dilapidated building as evoking The Shining and The Great Gatsby.

During down time on the shoot,  Alexander Burnett took several photographs with portraits of L Ron Hubbard.

Remix
An official "DREAMTRAK DIAMOND" remix was created frequent  Alexander Burnett and  Antony & Cleopatra collaborator by Dreamtrak (Swim Deep, Foals, Cymbals)  and uploaded to SoundCloud in 2011. 

Burnett requested a remix from Dreamtrak which "sounded like a surreal party that defies time and space that takes place at Studio 54 and the Hacienda at the same time."

References

2010 singles
2010 songs